Let's Live Again is a 1948 American comedy film directed by Herbert I. Leeds and written by Rodney Carlisle and Robert Smiley. The film stars John Emery, Hillary Brooke, Taylor Holmes, Diana Douglas, James Millican and Charles D. Brown. The film was released on February 27, 1948, by 20th Century Fox.

Plot
Atomic scientist Larry Blake and his uncle Jim receive news that Larry's explorer brother George, who had left on an expedition to Tibet to investigate reports of reincarnations there, is believed to have been killed in a plane crash. While Larry is in a bar drowning his sorrows, a dog suddenly appears. Larry becomes convinced the dog is George reincarnated and has returned to annoy him.

Cast   
John Emery as Larry Blake
Hillary Brooke as Sandra Marlowe
Taylor Holmes as Uncle Jim
Diana Douglas as Terry
James Millican as George Blake
Charles D. Brown as Psychiatrist
Percy Helton as Mr. President
Jeff Corey as Bartender
Earle Hodgins as Novelty salesman
John Parrish as Doctor
Dewey Robinson as Policeman

References

External links 
 

1948 films
20th Century Fox films
American comedy films
1948 comedy films
Films directed by Herbert I. Leeds
Films scored by Raoul Kraushaar
American black-and-white films
1940s English-language films
1940s American films